Oxyptilus erythrodactylus is a moth of the family Pterophoridae that was described by Thomas Bainbrigge Fletcher in 1911. It is known from South Africa.

References

Endemic moths of South Africa
Oxyptilini
Moths described in 1911
Moths of Africa
Plume moths of Africa